Ek Thi Rani Ek Tha Raavan is an Indian Hindi-language drama television series that premiered from 21 January 2019 to 21 September 2019 on Star Bharat and is digitally available on Disney+ Hotstar. An adaptation of Darr, it starred Ram Yashvardhan, Manul Chudasama and Sheezan Mohd.

Plot

Cast  
 Ram Yashvardhan as Rivaaj
 Manul Chudasama as Rani
 Srishti Jain as Rani/Mayura
 Sheezan Mohammed as Raghav
 Nattasha Singh as Kesha
 Sara Khan as Dancer (Ringa ringa)

Production 
The series was announced in 2019 by Star Bharat, an official television adaptation of the 1993 Hindi film Darr. The promos were released in December 2018. Ram Yashvardhan was cast in the titular role, and was joined by Manul Chudasama and Sheezan Mohammed as leads. Due to creative differences Manul Chudasama was replaced overnight with Srishti Jain. Nattasha Singh was cast to portray the negative lead. Mahek Chahal had a cameo appearance in the show, but later replaced with Sara Khan. It premeried on Star Bharat from 21 January 2019 and went off-air within 9 months on 21 September 2019, due to low viewership.

See also 
 List of programs broadcast by Star Bharat

References

External links 
 
 Ek Thi Rani Ek Tha Raavan on Disney+ Hotstar

Indian television series
2019 Indian television series debuts
2019 Indian television series endings
Star Bharat original programming